Nain (Inuit language: Nunainguk) is the northernmost permanent settlement in the Canadian province of Newfoundland and Labrador, within the Nunatsiavut region, located about  by air from Happy Valley-Goose Bay. The town was established as a Moravian mission in 1771 by Jens Haven and other missionaries. As of 2021, the population is 1,204 mostly Inuit and mixed Inuit-European. Nain is the administrative capital of the autonomous region of Nunatsiavut.

Nain is inaccessible by road and may be reached only by air or sea.

History 

Nain was first established in 1771 by Moravian missionaries. It is among the oldest permanent Inuit settlements in Canada, most communities in Nunavut and Nunavik were settled in the 1950s or later. It is also the oldest continuously-inhabited community in Labrador after North West River. Nain has also been called "Nonynuke", "Nuninock" and "Nunaingoakh". The missionaries also established posts in Hopedale and areas in the north such as Hebron and Okak. The first Inuk to be baptized in Nain was a man named Kingminguse who took the name "Petrus" after conversion and then returned to southern Labrador where he used the name "Petrus Kingminguse" and died in 1800. Many Inuit in the south traveled to the Moravian posts in the north to be baptized and then returned to the south. The Moravians established posts only in northern areas since the Colony of Newfoundland hoped to colonize southern Labrador. In 1773, it was claimed that over 250 Inuit lived in Nain. In 1893, Nain's residents adopted patrilineal surnames at the request of Newfoundland courts. Many people took names of the missionaries (such as "Kohlmeister" and Townley") while others chose traditional names such as "Agnatok", "Kalleo", "Karpik", "Merkuratsuk", "Pamak" and "Saksagiak" or other European names such as "Abel" and "Obed". During the 19th-century, many people from southern parts of Labrador (mostly of mixed European and Inuit descent) and also from England and Newfoundland settled on islands near Nain and introduced names to the area such as "Ford", "Lyall", "Flowers", "Dicker" and "Webb". Most of these island settlements were resettled in the 1950s and 1960s and their inhabitants mostly settled in Nain. 6 Innu (Naskapi) families were recorded in Nain in 1945.

In 1959, residents of Hebron and Nutak resettled to Nain, Hopedale, Makkovik and Happy Valley-Goose Bay. The relocation had a huge impact on residents of Hebron and Nutak since the land in Nain (and other communities) was very different (resulting in difficulties when hunting) and many families were divided. Poverty and alcoholism has affected many of the families that originated in Hebron and Nutak. The provincial government apologized for the relocations in 2005. Many Inuit from Hebron were relocated to Nain by the provincial government after the Moravian mission at Hebron was closed under government pressure in 1959.

In 2016, the Google Street View imaging service uploaded images of various roads in Nain. Nain is one of the few communities in Labrador with images on the service.

Nunatsiavut

On December 1, 2005, Nain became the administrative capital of the autonomous region of Nunatsiavut which is the name chosen by the Labrador Inuit when the Labrador Inuit Land Claims Agreement Act was successfully ratified by the Canadian Government and the Inuit of Labrador. Hopedale, further south, is the legislative capital. The land claim cedes limited self-rule for the Nunatsiavut government in Northern Labrador and North-Eastern Quebec, granting title and aboriginal rights. The Inuit of Labrador do not own this land per se, but they do have special rights related to traditional land use as aboriginals. That said, the Labrador Inuit will own  within the Settlement Area, officially designated as Labrador Inuit Lands.

Geography 
Nain is located on the north side of Unity Bay, a small inlet. The bay is open to the Atlantic Ocean but Nain's harbour is protected by numerous islands, the largest of which is Paul's Island.

Climate
Although located at the same latitude as Ketchikan on North America's west coast,  or Moscow and southern Scandinavia in Europe, the influence of the Labrador Current gives Nain a marginal subarctic climate (Dfc) that is very close to a polar climate (ET), which creates the southernmost tree line in the northern hemisphere on the adjacent coast. The southernmost tundra is actually still in a zone of discontinuous permafrost rather than the much more typical continuous zone. The actual depth of snow on the ground averages  at the end of March. Occasionally, very warm weather occurs in summer when winds blow offshore.

Local government

The town is governed by a seven-member council composed of a mayor (or Angajukĸâk), deputy mayor (Deputy Angajukĸâk), and five councilors.

The Town Council formally changed its name from "Nain Town Council" to "Nain Inuit Community Government" in October 2006. The Nain Inuit Community Government meets once per month.

Educational facilities
Nain has one kindergarten to level III school, Jens Haven Memorial, which is split between two buildings. One building contains primary grades (kindergarten to grade 3), the other houses elementary and secondary grades (grade 4 to Level III).

There is also an adult basic education (ABE) program offered in town, delivered by Academy Canada. Academy Canada delivers this program in Nain and throughout Labrador in communities including Happy Valley - Goose Bay, Hopedale, Labrador City, Natuashish and Sheshatshiu.

Industry
Fishing is the main industry in Nain. Traditional hunting and trapping activities continue through the winter months after the fishing season has ended.

Demographics 

Ethnicity

Language (2016 census)
 English: 810
 Inuktitut: 295

Media
Nain has two radio services available.

CKOK-FM is a low-power (LP) re-broadcaster of CKHV broadcasting at 99.9 FM. Owned by the Okalakatiget Society, the station broadcasts a community radio format for the region's First Nations and Inuit communities.

As of the end of 2014, the station now streams online. It broadcasts live during local programming only.

There is also a local re-broadcaster of Happy Valley-Goose Bay's CBC Radio One feed, CBNZ. It operates on 740 AM.

Transport 
Flights to Nain are at Nain Airport, and are available from Happy Valley-Goose Bay on Air Borealis (part of PAL Airlines).

Between mid-June and mid-November (pending ice conditions), the ferry MV Kamutik W, operated by the Newfoundland and Labrador Government, provides weekly service from Goose Bay along the Atlantic Coast, with stops in Rigolet, Makkovik, Postville, Hopedale and Natuashish. Nain is the northernmost stop on the route; the ferry stays docked at Nain for about three hours before beginning its southbound route.

See also 
 List of cities and towns in Newfoundland and Labrador
 List of historic places in Labrador
 Nain Airport
 Nunatsiavut
 Voisey's Bay Mine

References

External links 
 Nineteenth-Century artwork of Nain
 Okalakatiget Society
 Okalakatiget Society Live Web Stream [Local Programming Only]
 
 
 Nain - Encyclopedia of Newfoundland and Labrador, vol. 4, p. 1-3.

Inuit community governments in Newfoundland and Labrador
Populated coastal places in Canada
History of the Labrador Province of the Moravian Church
Populated places in Labrador
Hudson's Bay Company trading posts
Road-inaccessible communities of Newfoundland and Labrador
Fishing communities in Canada